Iliotona is a genus of clown beetles in the family Histeridae. There are about five described species in Iliotona.

Species
These five species belong to the genus Iliotona:
 Iliotona beyeri (Schaefer, 1907)
 Iliotona cacti (J. L. LeConte, 1851)
 Iliotona dorcoides (Lewis, 1888)
 Iliotona gilli Sokolov & Tishechkin, 2010
 Iliotona markushevae Sokolov, 2005

References

Further reading

 
 

Histeridae
Articles created by Qbugbot